Quentin P. Riggins (born April 14, 1968) is a former American football linebacker who played one season with the Winnipeg Blue Bombers of the Canadian Football League (CFL). He played college football at Auburn University and attended Robert E. Lee High School in Montgomery, Alabama. He was also a member of the Raleigh-Durham Skyhawks of the World League of American Football (WLAF).

Early years
Riggins played high school football for the Robert E. Lee High School Generals. He was initially a tailback before converted to linebacker. He helped the Generals reach the quarterfinals his senior season before losing to eventual state champion Northview. Riggins earned all-state honors while also playing fullback and handling kickoff duties for the Generals.

College career
Riggins played for the Auburn Tigers from 1986 to 1989. He was team captain his senior year in 1989 and helped the Tigers win three consecutive SEC championships his final three seasons. He earned second-team All-American and first-team All-SEC honors in 1988 and 1989. Riggins also recorded totals of 398 tackles (200 solo, 198 assists) during his college career. He was named to the SEC Football Legends Class of 2009.

Professional career
Riggins signed with the CFL's Winnipeg Blue Bombers in June 1990. He played for the Blue Bombers during the 1990 season, winning the 78th Grey Cup. He played for the Raleigh-Durham Skyhawks of the WLAF in 1991.

Broadcasting career
Riggins has covered Auburn Tigers football on the radio as a sideline reporter for the Auburn IMG Sports Network since 1991.

Political career
Riggins was appointed by Gov. Bob Riley to serve as his Director of Legislative Affairs in 2003. He also served as a legislative affairs analyst for former Speaker of the House of Representatives Seth Hammett. He later led governmental affairs efforts for six years as senior vice president of the Business Council of Alabama before starting his own governmental affairs firm.

Mr. Riggins currently leads governmental affairs as senior vice president of Alabama Power. He also serves on the Auburn University Board of Trustees upon his confirmation by the Alabama Senate on February 9, 2017.

Personal life
Riggins and his wife, Kimi, have one daughter and they live in Trussville.

References

External links
Just Sports Stats
College stats

Living people
1966 births
Players of American football from Montgomery, Alabama
American football linebackers
Canadian football linebackers
African-American players of American football
African-American players of Canadian football
Auburn Tigers football players
Winnipeg Blue Bombers players
Raleigh–Durham Skyhawks players
American radio sports announcers
African-American sports announcers
Auburn Tigers football announcers
21st-century American businesspeople
American energy industry businesspeople
African-American businesspeople
Businesspeople from Alabama
Sportspeople from Montgomery, Alabama
21st-century African-American people
20th-century African-American sportspeople